Henry Arthur Morgan, D.D. (1 July 1830 – 2 September 1912) was an English academic, master of Jesus College, Cambridge from 1885 until his death.

Morgan was born in Gothenburg and educated at Shrewsbury and Jesus College, Cambridge. He was ordained in 1859. He was Fellow of Jesus from 1858 to 1885.

References

1830 births
1912 deaths
Masters of Jesus College, Cambridge
Fellows of Jesus College, Cambridge
Alumni of Jesus College, Cambridge
People educated at Shrewsbury School
People from Gothenburg